Potassium superoxide is an inorganic compound with the formula KO2.  It is a yellow paramagnetic solid that decomposes in moist air.  It is a rare example of a stable salt of the superoxide anion. It is used as a  scrubber,  dehumidifier, and  generator in rebreathers, spacecraft, submarines, and spacesuits.

Production and reactions
Potassium superoxide is produced by burning molten potassium in an atmosphere of excess oxygen. 
K +  → 
The O−O distance is 1.28 Å.

Reactivity
Potassium superoxide is a source of superoxide, which is a reductant and a nucleophile, depending on its reaction partner.

Upon contact with water, it undergoes disproportionation to potassium hydroxide, oxygen, and hydrogen peroxide:
2  +  → 2 KOH +  
 +  → KOH +   +  

It reacts with carbon dioxide, releasing oxygen:
2  +  → K2CO3 +  
2  + 2  + H2O → 2 KHCO3 +  

Potassium superoxide finds only niche uses as a laboratory reagent. Because it reacts with water,  is often studied in organic solvents. Since the salt is poorly soluble in nonpolar solvents, crown ethers are typically used. The tetraethylammonium salt is also known.  Representative reactions of these salts involve using superoxide as a nucleophile, e.g., in converting alkyl bromides to alcohols and acyl chlorides to diacyl peroxides.

Ion exchange with tetramethylammonium hydroxide gives tetramethylammonium superoxide, a yellow solid.

Applications
The Russian Space Agency has had success using potassium superoxide in chemical oxygen generators for its spacesuits and Soyuz spacecraft.  has also been used in canisters for rebreathers for fire fighting and mine rescue work, but had limited use in scuba rebreathers because of its highly exothermic reaction with water.

References

Potassium compounds
Superoxides
Oxidizing agents